State Highway 16 (SH-16 or OK-16) is a state highway in Oklahoma.  It runs in an irregular 99.2-mile west-to-east pattern through the northeastern part of the state, running from SH-33 at Drumright to SH-51 at Wagoner.  There are no letter-suffixed spur highways branching from SH-16.

SH-16 was established in 1936 as a gravel highway running between Bristow at its western end and Beggs at its eastern end. Since then, the highway has been paved and gradually extended to both the east and the west, finally reaching its present-day extent in 1965.

Route description
SH-16 begins at SH-33 on the east side of Drumright, in western Creek County.  From there, it travels six miles (10 km) south to the town of Shamrock, then  roughly southeasterly to the city of Bristow.

SH-16 briefly overlaps SH-48 and SH-66 through Bristow.

Four miles (6.4 km) east of Beggs, SH-16 intersects U.S. Route 75, a major national north/south highway and prominent in the area as a four-lane expressway connecting Tulsa and Okmulgee. From there it runs due east, intersecting SH-52 near the community of Bald Hill.

Twelve miles (19.3 km) after SH-52, SH-16 joins up with U.S. Route 62/64, six miles (10 km) south of Haskell.  Five miles (8 km) later, SH-162 branches off to the north, connecting with the town of Taft, and in another eight miles (13 km) enters the city of Muskogee along Okmulgee Street.

In Muskogee, SH-16 meets U.S. Route 69 at 32nd Street, and turning north, forms a brief three-way concurrency (US-62/69/SH-16).  At Shawnee Bypass, U.S. Route 62 and SH-16 turn east, and overlap three miles (5 km) to York Street, where SH-16 turns north on its own again.

SH-16 crosses the Arkansas and Verdigris Rivers, and passes under the Muskogee Turnpike, intersecting with SH-251A in Okay.  Eight miles (12.9 km) farther to the north and west, SH-16 ends at SH-51, on the south side of Wagoner.

History
The present incarnation of SH-16 first appeared on Oklahoma's state highway map in 1937 as a gravel highway connecting Bristow to Beggs. This would be SH-16's extent for nearly two decades. This section of the highway was first paved in 1950.

SH-16 was not extended beyond Beggs until 1954, when it was extended east to US-62 and US-64. This section of gravel highway had a slight jog to the north, causing it to meet the U.S. highways at Jamesville, north of the present-day junction. The following year, SH-16 was extended even further east, passing through Muskogee via US-62, US-64, and US-69, and proceeding along its present-day alignment to Okay. In Okay, the highway turned east, following present-day SH-251A across Fort Gibson Dam and coming to an end at SH-80. This extension was entirely paved.

In 1958, the jog between Beggs and Jamesville was removed, moving the US-62/64 junction to its present-day location; this portion of highway remained unpaved. The 1961 map shows the entirety of the Beggs—US-62/64 segment as paved, however, the following year's map shows the portion east of the Okmulgee–Muskogee County line as gravel. By 1963 this portion of gravel highway in Muskogee County had apparently been paved.

The highway was extended again in 1961, this time to the west. At that time, SH-16 absorbed the wholly paved SH-27 between Bristow and Drumright, setting its western terminus at its present-day location. SH-16's final extension occurred in 1965, when SH-251A was established and SH-16 was realigned to instead continue north past Okay and terminate at SH-51 in Wagoner. No further changes have been made to the highway since then.

Junction list

References

016
Transportation in Creek County, Oklahoma
Transportation in Okmulgee County, Oklahoma
Transportation in Muskogee County, Oklahoma
Transportation in Wagoner County, Oklahoma